"A Question of Time" is Depeche Mode's seventeenth UK single, released on 11 August 1986, following the similarly titled "A Question of Lust" single.

The 7" remix of "A Question of Time" runs at a slightly faster tempo and pitch than the original Black Celebration album version. A version of the remix with an even faster tempo appeared on The Singles 86–98.

There is no new track for a B-side (the first Depeche Mode single, other than the Double A-Side "Blasphemous Rumours / Somebody" without one), but instead includes a remix of "Black Celebration" and various live tracks.

The "New Town Remix" directly segues into the "Live Remix" on the limited 12" single.

The music video for "A Question of Time" is the first DM video to be directed by Anton Corbijn, and was the start of a relationship with him and the band which still lasts to this day. It was included on the Strange video, The Videos 86-98, the DVD of The Best of Depeche Mode Volume 1 and on Video Singles Collection.

The post-'90s live renditions of the track have a heavy guitar sound.

Track listings

7": Mute / 7Bong12 (UK)
 "A Question of Time (Remix)" – 4:04 (remixed by Phil Harding)
 "Black Celebration (Live)" – 6:05

12": Mute / 12Bong12 (UK)
 "A Question of Time (Extended Remix)" – 6:38 (remixed by Phil Harding)
 "Black Celebration (Live)" – 6:05
 "Something to Do (Live)" – 3:50
 "Stripped (Live)" – 6:21

12": Mute / L12Bong12 (UK)
 "A Question of Time (New Town Mix)" – 6:59 (remixed by Rico Conning)
 "A Question of Time (Live Remix)" – 4:10
 "Black Celebration (Black Tulip Mix)" – 6:32 (remixed by Rico Conning)
 "More Than a Party (Live)" – 5:05

CD: Mute / CDBong12 (UK)
 "A Question of Time (Remix)" – 4:04
 "Black Celebration (Live)" – 6:05
 "Something to Do (Live)" – 3:50
 "Stripped (Live)" – 6:21
 "More Than a Party (Live)" – 5:05
 "A Question of Time (Extended Remix)" – 6:38
 "Black Celebration (Black Tulip Mix)" – 6:32
 "A Question of Time (New Town Mix/Live Remix)" – 11:08

The CD single was released in 1991 as part of the singles box set compilations.

CD: Intercord / Mute INT 826.850 (W.GERMANY)
 "A Question of Time (Extended Remix)" – 6:38
 "Stripped (Live)" – 6:22
 "Black Celebration (Live)" – 6:05
 "Something to Do (Live)" – 3:50
 "A Question of Time (Remix)" – 4:04
 Live tracks recorded on 10 April 1986 at the Birmingham N.E.C.

12": Sire / 0-20530 (US, 1989)
 "A Question of Time (Extended Remix)" – 6:38
 "Something to Do (Live)" – 3:50
 "A Question of Lust (Minimal)" – 6:49
 "Black Celebration (Live)" – 6:05
 "A Question of Lust (Minimal)" is falsely titled "A Question of Lust (Extended Version)"
 Double A-Side with "A Question of Lust"

All songs written by Martin L. Gore
All live tracks were recorded at the Birmingham N.E.C., on 10 April 1986.

Music video
The music video directed by Anton Corbijn features all of the band members holding babies. In the beginning of the music video, Alan Wilder is shown on a porch waiting for something. A man dressed almost like a daredevil rides a motorcycle with a baby. He drives to Alan on the porch and hands him the baby. The video shows the other members of the band holding a baby. One baby grabs onto Martin's hair and yanks it profusely while he smiles.

Charts

Weekly charts

Year-end charts

Notable cover versions
Dutch electronic band Clan of Xymox recorded the song on their cover theme album Kindred Spirits (2012)
International cover band Exit Eden covered the song on their debut album "Rhapsodies in Black".

References

External links
 Single information from the official Depeche Mode web site

1986 singles
1986 songs
1989 singles
Black-and-white music videos
Depeche Mode songs
Industrial songs
Music videos directed by Anton Corbijn
Mute Records singles
Song recordings produced by Daniel Miller
Song recordings produced by Gareth Jones
Songs written by Martin Gore
UK Independent Singles Chart number-one singles